Iodine is a 2009 Canadian Sci-Fi drama film written and directed by Michael Stasko.

Plot

John Clem (Michael Stasko) heads north to investigate the disappearance of his estranged father. Upon arriving at the family cottage, John runs into Avery (Ray Wise), his father’s colleague.  John receives no help on his dad’s disappearance, but instead, a new set of eyes in which to view the living world around him. Avery assures John that they had been working on a special project which involved using iodine as a water purification tool, to preserve their natural surroundings.  Environmental concerns and future implications of modernized society become a share interest and source of impassioned philosophical discussion for the two and they bond.  However, John being a man of immense insecurity and uncertainty is forced to endure isolating surroundings while on the search for his father.  The pressure from the rest of the family causes John an emotional breakdown as he is unsure of whether he can trust Avery.

Partial cast

 Michael Stasko as John
 Ray Wise as Avery
 Jodi Behan as Marissa
 Jason Collett as Deputy Peel
 Vicki Rivard as Laura

Production

The crew consisted of ten film students and done on a low budget.  The project was filmed in Northern Ontario's Parry Sound on super 16mm film, over the course of 15 days.  Produced by The Dot Film Company Inc., it runs for 97 minutes and was recognized in the Montreal World Film Festival in 2009.

Michael Stasko (Things To Do, 2006) wrote, produced, directed and acted in this film.  This was Jason Collett's acting debut serving as comic relief Deputy Peel.  The film was recognized by the Montreal Gazette for its well placed score which was produced by Michael Stasko and Eric Schiller.

Reception

References

External links
 Iodine at the Internet Movie Database
 Official website

2009 films
Canadian drama films
English-language Canadian films
2009 drama films
2000s English-language films
2000s Canadian films